Calycorectes schottianus is a species of plant in the family Myrtaceae. It is endemic to Atlantic Forest habitats in Rio de Janeiro (state) of southeastern Brazil.

References

schottianus
Endemic flora of Brazil
Flora of Rio de Janeiro (state)
Flora of the Atlantic Forest
Critically endangered flora of South America
Taxonomy articles created by Polbot